Roller shoes are shoes that have wheels protruding slightly from the heel, allowing the wearer to alternate between walking and rolling.

There are a number of tricks that can be done with them, including pop wheelies and spins.

These shoes commonly include either one or two wheels on them.

Speeds 
Although not found usually, roller shoes can have a battery and other items that would be related to machinery.
Depending on how fast you run, roller shoes should go 5 - 25 MPH

See also
 Aircoasters
 Heelys

References

Athletic shoes
Roller skates